New Game! is an anime television series based on the manga series created by Shōtarō Tokunō and published in Houbunsha's Manga Time Kirara Carat magazine. The series follows Aoba Suzukaze, a high school graduate who begins working at the Eagle Jump video game company as a character designer alongside her female colleagues. The anime is produced by Doga Kobo, with Yoshiyuki Fujiwara as the director and Fumihiko Shimo as the series' script supervisor, featuring character designs by Ai Kikuchi. The first season aired in Japan between July 4 and September 19, 2016 and was simulcast by Crunchyroll. An original video animation (OVA) episode was available for those who purchased all six Blu-Ray/DVD volumes of the series, released between September 28, 2016 and February 24, 2017. A second season titled New Game!! was announced in February 2017, and aired between July 11 and September 26, 2017. The series is licensed in North America by Funimation, who are releasing English dubs of both seasons.

Episode list

New Game! (2016)

New Game!! (2017)

Notes

References

New Game!